The 1966 SFR Yugoslavia Chess Championship was the 21st edition of SFR Yugoslav Chess Championship. Held in Titograd, SFR Yugoslavia, SR Montenegro, between 24 November and 19 December 1965. The tournament was won by Svetozar Gligorić.

References

External links 
 https://www.chessgames.com/perl/chess.pl?tid=91120
 http://www.perpetualcheck.com/show/show.php?lan=cp&data=Y1965002

Yugoslav Chess Championships
1966 in chess
Chess